Montega is a collaborative studio album by Moroccan-American hip hop recording artist French Montana and American record producer Harry Fraud, released on June 24, 2022 by Coke Boys Records. It features guest appearances by Babyface Ray, Benny the Butcher, Chinx, EST Gee, Fleurie, Jadakiss, Quavo and Rick Ross. The album is entirely produced by Harry Fraud.

Track listing

Track listing adapted from Apple Music.

All tracks produced by Harry Fraud.

Charts

References

2022 mixtape albums
French Montana albums
Albums produced by Harry Fraud